Antonio Herin (1896 – 1992) was an Italian cross-country skier. Herin finished 13th at the 1924 Winter Olympics in Chamonix at the competition of 18-km-cross-country skiing.

References

External links
Mention of Antonio Herin's death 

1896 births
1992 deaths
Italian male cross-country skiers
Olympic cross-country skiers of Italy
Cross-country skiers at the 1924 Winter Olympics